Fred Homer Diute (January 9, 1929 – July 19, 2004) was an American professional basketball player. Diute was selected in the 1951 NBA Draft by the Rochester Royals after a collegiate career at St. Bonaventure. He played for the Milwaukee Hawks in 1954–55 and averaged 1.6 points, 1.9 rebounds and 0.6 assists per contest in 11 career games.

References

1929 births
2004 deaths
Basketball players from New York (state)
Milwaukee Hawks players
Rochester Royals draft picks
Shooting guards
St. Bonaventure Bonnies men's basketball players
American men's basketball players